La Vendetta is a Philippine television drama horror series broadcast by GMA Network. Directed by Gil Tejada Jr. and Lore Reyes, it stars Jennylyn Mercado, Sunshine Dizon and Jean Garcia. It premiered on October 29, 2007 on the network's Telebabad line up. The series concluded on January 18, 2008 with a total of 60 episodes.

The series is streaming online on YouTube.

Premise
The story focuses on sisters named Amanda, Eloisa and Almira. Amanda is the eldest who had her mother died early. Her father married another woman with whom he had two more daughters. Sibling rivalry ensues between the sisters when they all vie for their father's attention. One night Almira will be killed, an incident that will eventually reveal the killer.

Overview

Pre-production
The production started late September, while principal photography started on October 12, 2007 for an October 29, 2007 airdate. While the pre-production was conceived long before 2005, and had to be postponed because of the "boom" of telefantasyas.

Casting
This series is the much-awaited come-back series for Jennylyn Mercado after the feud between her manager and GMA Network, her role was expected to recurred but while the series is ongoing her character was upgraded into a series regular. This is also Sunshine Dizon's new series after the recently concluded Impostora.

In addition, this is also the come-back Philippine drama for veterans Rustom Padilla (now known as BB Gandanghari) and Snooky Serna after their recent showbiz revelations.

Sheryl Cruz was initially tapped to play Amanda, but chose to do Princess Sarah with ABS-CBN instead. Jean Garcia was chosen for her replacement.

Cast and characters

Lead cast
 Jennylyn Mercado as Almira Cardinale
 Sunshine Dizon as Eloisa Salumbides-Cardinale
 Jean Garcia as Amanda Cardinale

Supporting cast
 Paolo Contis as Junjun Sabino
 Polo Ravales as Gabby Trajano
 Luis Alandy as Ariel Guevarra
 Wendell Ramos as Rigo Bayani
 Chynna Ortaleza as Joanna Alumpihit
 Angelica Jones as Gerta Lamismis
 Ynna Asistio as Alex Cardinale
 Joseph Marco as Santi Domingo
 Rustom Padilla (now known as BB Gandanghari) as Alfie Camba
 Dante Rivero as Edwin Cardinale
 Caridad Sanchez as Nana Mildred
 Lotlot de Leon as Rodora Alhambra
 Ella Guevara as Jessie Cardinale

Guest cast
 Mark Herras as Galo Alumpihit
 Snooky Serna as Janet Salumbides
 Krystal Reyes as young Eloisa
 Hazel Ann Mendoza as teen Amanda
 Karen delos Reyes as Andrea
 Sheila Marie Rodriguez as Alona
 Jenny Miller as Mariel
 Miguel Tanfelix as young Junjun
 Deborah Sun as Alice Bayani
 Maricel Morales as Rebecca
 Jen Rosendahl as Vicky
 Gene Padilla as Dodong
 Nicole Dulalia as young Rodora
 Joy Folloso as young Amanda
 Jelaine Santos as Gigi
 Cheska Iñigo as Jaydine

Ratings
According to AGB Nielsen Philippines' Mega Manila household television ratings, the pilot episode of La Vendetta earned a 28.7% rating. While the final episode scored a 33.4% rating.

Accolades

References

External links
 
 

2007 Philippine television series debuts
2008 Philippine television series endings
Filipino-language television shows
GMA Network drama series
Murder in television
Philippine crime television series
Philippine horror fiction television series
Television shows set in the Philippines